The Thomas Creek Archeological District is a U.S. historic district located east of Chumuckla, Florida. On November 4, 1985, it was added to the U.S. National Register of Historic Places.

References

External links
 Santa Rosa County listings at National Register of Historic Places
 Santa Rosa County listings at Florida's Office of Cultural and Historical Programs

Native American history of Florida
Archaeological sites in Florida
National Register of Historic Places in Santa Rosa County, Florida
Historic districts on the National Register of Historic Places in Florida
1985 establishments in Florida